Lagos Business School (LBS) is the graduate business school of Pan-Atlantic University, owned by the Pan-Atlantic University Foundation (PAUF), a non-profit foundation registered in Nigeria.  LBS was founded on inspirations from the teachings of St Josemaria Escrivá, the founder of Opus Dei. LBS offers academic programmes, executive programmes and short focused programmes in Management. The LBS main campus is located in Ajah, Lekki, Lagos State.

The school was established in 1991,  LBS has collaborated with other business schools in Africa and around the world on programmes to develop responsible business leaders for Africa and the world.

LBS is a member of the Association of African Business Schools (AABS), the Global Business School Network (GBSN), the Principles for Responsible Management Education (PRME) and AACSB International – Association to Advance Collegiate Schools of Business. 

Chris Ogbechie is the dean of LBS. He sets the strategic direction for the School and oversees academic and administrative matters.

Rankings 

On 1 December 2016, LBS received accreditation from AACSB (Association to Advance Collegiate Schools of Business), becoming the first institution in West Africa to be thus accredited. Lagos Business School (LBS) also proved its standards in management education as the International Accreditation Advisory Board of the Association of MBAs (AMBA) accredited the MBA programmes offered by the school on 8 December 2016.

LBS became the first tertiary institution in Nigeria to receive the ISO 9001:2015 certificate, an international standard measurement for Quality Management Systems.

LBS has been ranked every year since 2007 by the Financial Times of London among the top 70 business schools in the world in the area of open enrollment executive education (2007–2020) and custom executive education (2015-2020).

Gallery

Affiliations
LBS is in relationship with top business enterprises in Nigeria and top multinationals in Africa.

In January 2017, LBS joined 220 other leading business schools across the globe to become an affiliate of the Graduate Management Admission Council (GMAC), a non-profit organisation of leading graduate business schools in the world, and owner and administrator of the GMAT exam.

By virtue of its AACSB accreditation, LBS became a member of the MBA Career Services & Employer Alliance in September 2017.

Business school partners 
LBS is in partnership with international business schools, with which it carries out periodic exchange programmes. They include:

 IESE Business School – Spain
 IESEG School of Management – France
 IPADE Business School – Mexico
 Nanyang Business School – Singapore
 Strathmore Business School – Kenya
 University of Cape Town Graduate School of Business – South Africa
 University of Stellenbosch Business School – South Africa
 Bocconi University
 Indian Institute of Management, Ahmedabad
 Arizona State University
 MDE Business School

Programmes

Academic programmes
 Full-time MBA ( MBA)
 Executive MBA (EMBA)
 Modular Executive MBA (MEMBA)
 Modular MBA (MMBA)

Executive education
Lagos Business School offers a range of programmes designed for professionals.

These classes are taught by full-time faculty. The open enrollment programmes are:

 Chief Executive Programme
 Advanced Management Programme
 Senior Management Programme
 Owner Manager Programme
 Agribusiness Management Programme
 Management Acceleration Programme
 Open Seminars
 Custom Programmes

Centres 
 Christopher Kolade Centre for Research in Leadership and Ethics 
 Centre for Infrastructure Policy Regulation and Advancement

Notable alumni 
Omobola Johnson
Babajide Sanwo-Olu
 Ibukun Awosika
 Seyi Makinde, Nigerian businessman, politician and Governor of Oyo State
 Ayodeji Balogun, Nigerian entrepreneur, commodity trader and CEO, AFEX
 Peter Obi
 Bola Akindele
 Olorogun O'tega Emerhor
 Femi Adesina
 Adebayo Alonge
 Ben Akabueze
 Ibidunni Ighodalo
 Adebola Adesola
 Ademola Adebise, Managing Director/Chief executive officer of Wema Bank Plc
Adewale Adeyipo

References 

Educational institutions established in 1991
Business schools in Lagos
Pan-Atlantic University
1991 establishments in Nigeria